Redland is a census-designated place and an unincorporated area in Montgomery County, Maryland,  United States. It had a population of 18,592 as of the 2020 census.

Geography
As an unincorporated area, Redland's boundaries are not officially defined. Redland is, however, recognized by the United States Census Bureau as a census-designated place, and by the United States Geological Survey as a populated place located at  (39.137931, −77.155292).

Demographics

As of the census of 2000, there were 16,998 people, 5,272 households, and 4,423 families living in the area. The racial makeup of the area was 55.04% White, 15.75% African American, 0.35% Native American, 15.94% Asian, 0.05% Pacific Islander, 8.6% from other races, and 4.29% from two or more races. Hispanic or Latino of any race were 15.1% of the population.

There were 5,272 households, out of which 44.8% had children under the age of 18 living with them, 68.3% were married couples living together, 11.6% had a female householder with no husband present, and 16.1% were non-families. 11.3% of all households were made up of individuals, and 2.6% had someone living alone who was 65 years of age or older. The average household size was 3.22 and the average family size was 3.46.

In the area, the population was spread out, with 29.7% under the age of 18, 7.8% from 18 to 24, 30.2% from 25 to 44, 25.8% from 45 to 64, and 6.6% who were 65 years of age or older. The median age was 35 years. For every 100 females, there were 98.5 males. For every 100 females age 18 and over, there were 95.2 males.

The median income for a household in the area was $80,821, and the median income for a family was $82,146. Males had a median income of $52,776 versus $37,482 for females. The per capita income for the area was $27,542. About 4.0% of families and 5.4% of the population were below the poverty line, including 6.5% of those under age 18 and 10.4% of those age 65 or over.

References

Census-designated places in Maryland
Census-designated places in Montgomery County, Maryland